Nombela is a municipality of Spain belonging to the province of Toledo, Castilla–La Mancha. According to the 2006 census (INE), the municipality has a population of 981 inhabitants.

Geography 
Located in the central part of the Iberian Peninsula at about 490 metres above mean sea level, the town is the Spanish settlement farthest removed from the sea.

History 
Nombela earned the status of 'town' (villa) in 1579.

References
Citations

Bibliography
 

Municipalities in the Province of Toledo